Professor Dame Jill Macleod Clark, DBE, RGN, FRCN has held key leadership roles in Nursing and Health care and was Dean of the Faculty of Health Sciences University of Southampton. She is currently Professor Emeritus at the University of Southampton and holds Visiting Professor positions in the UK, Canada and Australia.

She was educated at the London School of Economics (BSc) and at King's College London (PhD). She is a former Chair of the Council of Deans of Health and President of the Infection Control Nursing Association. She is engaged in policy agendas related to achieving sustainable health care and modernising the health and care workforce.  Her research has focussed on the care of people with long term conditions and those at the end of life, inter-professional education and health promotion.  Jill has been a member of successive UK Research Assessment Exercise panels including REF 2021.    She led the review of the NMC standards for future registered nurses, is a commissioner on the future NHS review and Chairs the Future Nurse Oversight Board. She was made a Fellow of the Royal College of Nursing in 1997.

References

External links
University of Southampton

Alumni of the London School of Economics
Alumni of King's College London
Academics of the University of Southampton
Nursing researchers
Dames Commander of the Order of the British Empire
Fellows of the Royal College of Nursing
Place of birth missing (living people)

British nurses